The 2014 Asian Para Games, also known as the 2nd Asian Para Games, was an Asian disabled multi-sport event held in Incheon, South Korea, from 18 to 24 October 2014, 2 weeks after the end of the 2014 Asian Games. This was the first time South Korea hosted the games. Around 4,500 athletes from 41 countries competed in the games which featured 443 events in 23 sports. The games was opened by the Prime Minister Chung Hong-won at the Incheon Munhak Stadium. The final medal tally was led by China, followed by host South Korea and Japan, while Kazakhstan, Myanmar, Singapore, Syria and Qatar won their first ever Asian Para Games gold medal. 24 world and 121 Asian records were broken during the Games.

Host city
Incheon was the second city to host both Asian Games and Para Games after Guangzhou. It was awarded the sporting event in September 2009 by the Asian Paralympic Committee, and signed the Host Contract Agreement in January 2014 in Kuala Lumpur, Malaysia. Incheon Asian Para Games Organising Committee (IAPGOC) was formed to oversee the staging of the event.

Development and preparation

Venues
(Note:)
Incheon
Munhak Stadium - Opening and closing ceremonies
Asiad Main Stadium - Athletics
Munhak Park Tae-hwan Aquatics Center - Swimming
Seonhak Hockey Stadium - Football 5-a-side
Songlim Gymnasium - Sitting volleyball
Seonhak International Ice Rink - Goalball
Yeorumul Tennis Courts - Wheelchair tennis
Gyeyang Asiad Archery Field - Archery
Gyeyang Gymnasium - Badminton
Namdong Gymnasium - Boccia
Ganghwa Dolmens Gymnasium - Wheelchair dance
Seonhak Gymnasium - Wheelchair rugby
Ongnyeon International Shooting Range - Shooting
Namdong Asiad Rugby Field - Football 7-a-side
Samsan World Gymnasium - Wheelchair Basketball
Incheon Grand Park Lawnbowl Venue - Lawn bowls
Incheon International Velodrome - Cycling (track)
Songdo Road Cycling Course - Cycling (road)
Dowon Gymnasium - Judo
Songdo Global University Gymnasium - Table tennis
Wangsan Sailing Marina - Sailing
Songdo Global University Concert Hall - Wheelchair fencing
Moonlight Festival Garden Powerlifting Venue - Powerlifting
Gyeonggi Province
Anyang Hogye Gymnasium - Bowling
Hanam Misari Rowing Center - Rowing

Marketing

Logo
The logo of the 2014 Asian Para Games was unveiled on 17 June 2013 and is an image of a flame that symbolises the games itself. The blue and green symbolises the determination of the athletes, while the pink and orange flame represents the caring personality of the Asian people in general. All the colours combined on the logo represents the harmony of the people of Asia including the disables. Overall the logo represents the passion and challenging spirit of the games participating athletes as well as the unity of Asian people.

Mascot
The mascot of the 2014 Asian Para Games was unveiled on the same day as the logo and is a pair of black-faced spoonbill named, Jeonopi and Dnopi. They were chosen to highlight the games organiser commitment in environmental conservation. Jeonopi represents friendship with people in Asia and the world and the clean natural environment of host city Incheon, while Dnopi represents courage of the participating athletes and hope.

Medals
The medals of the event had the design of the flame at the front to express the passion and determination of the athletes. The braille letters of the event's name, "Incheon 2014 Asian Para Games is engraved on the back of the medal.

Ceremonies

Opening ceremony
The opening ceremony was held on 18 October 2014 at the Munhak Stadium with the theme, "Impossible drives us". It was attended by South Korean Prime Minister Chung Hung Won, International Paralympic Committee (IPC) President Sir Philip Craven and Asian Paralympic Committee President Dato Zainal Abu Zarin. The performance was directed by Yoo Joon-gyu and featured K-pop singer Kim Tae-woo. The South Korean prime minister declared the games open, while Lim Woo-geun lit the games cauldron.

Closing ceremony
The closing ceremony was held on 24 October 2014 at the Munhak Stadium, where the games was declared closed by Asian Paralympic President Dato' Zainal Abu Zarin.

Participitating national paralympic committees
41 NPCs participated in the event. North Korea compete for the first time, while Bangladesh did not attend due to inactivity which resulted in the termination of its International Paralympic Committee membership the following year.

Sports

Medal table

See also
2014 Asian Games

References

External links
Official website. Archived from the original on 25 October 2014.
Incheon official Kr website. Archived from the original on 23 October 2014.
Hong Kong delegation website

 
Asian Games
Asian Games
Asian
Asian Games
Sports competitions in Incheon
Multi-sport events in South Korea
Asian Para Games
Asian Games
Asian Games